The Kingwood Center Gardens is a historic  site with a house, Kingwood Hall, gardens and greenhouses located in Mansfield, Ohio.

Mr.  Charles  Kelley  King  began  making  his  fortune  when  he  was  hired  by  the  Ohio  Brass  Company  as  its  first  electrical  engineer  in  1893. He led Ohio Brass into new ventures, particularly the manufacture of electrical fittings for railroads and trolleys. Mr.  King  was  responsible  for  much  of  the  company's  success  and  he  eventually  became  president  and  chairman  of  the  Board  of  Ohio  Brass.  Mr.  King  was  married  and  divorced  twice,  and  had  no  children. The house and grounds were built in 1926 for King and his second wife, Luise, with grounds designed by Cleveland landscape architecture firm Pitkin and Mott. One year after  his  death  in  1952, the 47-acre estate opened as a public garden to a  private  foundation  that  continues  to  operate  Kingwood  Center  today.

On November 7, 1976, it was added to the National Register of Historic Places.

Current
In 1953 the estate became a public garden. The gardens are now open daily from 10am to 7pm. Admission is $8 per person (children 12 and under are free), and free for members and volunteers. Estate grounds currently include the following collections:

 Cacti and Succulent House - cacti and succulents.
 Daylily and Iris Collection - about 200 daylily cultivars, 54 Siberian iris cultivars, 50 cultivars of tall bearded iris, and 10 cultivars of reblooming tall bearded iris.
 Herb Garden (1977) - a knot garden in six sections, of herbs in juniper and boxwood edging.
 Historic Garden (1926) - a sequence of connected "rooms" enclosed by hedges, each built around a central feature such as a sunken garden, a small circular pool, a swimming pool, or a bronze sculpture of Pan.
 Parterre - boxwood edging filled with seasonal tulips and annuals.
 Perennial Garden - over 300 varieties of perennial plants in large borders.
 Rose Garden (1977) - nearly 500 roses, mainly hybrid teas and grandifloras, as well as a new section of David Austin roses.
 Terrace (1994) - seasonal beds of tulips and annuals, with a variety of shrubs.
 Tropical House - tropical plants, including Acalypha hispida (chenille plant), Acalypha wilkesiana 'Obovata Cristata' (copperleaf), Anthurium (flamingo flower), Codiaeum (croton), Cordyline fruticosa 'Fire Brand' (ti tree), Dichorisandra warscewicziana (blue ginger), Ficus deltoidea (mistletoe fig), Jatropha integerrima (spicy jatropha), Justicia brandegeeana (shrimp plant), and Rivina humilis (blood berry).
 Woodland - currently under development.

See also
 List of botanical gardens in the United States

References

https://myoncell.mobi/stops.php?acct_num=10994742897&stop=2

External links

 Kingwood Center

Buildings and structures in Mansfield, Ohio
Botanical gardens in Ohio
Houses on the National Register of Historic Places in Ohio
Historic house museums in Ohio
Historic districts on the National Register of Historic Places in Ohio
Museums in Richland County, Ohio
National Register of Historic Places in Richland County, Ohio
Protected areas of Richland County, Ohio
Houses in Richland County, Ohio
Parks on the National Register of Historic Places in Ohio